Oksana Kalashnikova (born 5 September 1990) is a Georgian professional tennis player.

Kalashnikova has won five WTA Tour doubles titles, three WTA Challenger doubles titles as well as five singles and 25 doubles titles on the ITF Circuit. On 5 July 2010, she reached her career-high singles ranking of No. 156. On 13 June 2016, she peaked at No. 43 in the WTA doubles rankings.

Playing for Georgia Fed Cup team since 2007, Kalashnikova has a win–loss record of 20–16 (as of December 2022).

Tennis career

2012
In 2012, Kalashnikova entered the ITF tournament in Astana, where she won the doubles event with Marta Sirotkina against twin sisters Lyudmyla and Nadiia Kichenok.

In November, she and Nina Bratchikova won the doubles title at the Royal Indian Open.

2013
She reached the third round of the 2013 French Open on her debut at this Major partnering Alicja Rosolska.

Kalashnikova won her first WTA doubles title at the 2013 Baku Cup, partnering Irina Buryachok against Eleni Daniilidou and Aleksandra Krunić.

After that, she and Alicja Rosolska reached the quarterfinals of the Canadian Open, a prestigious tournament serving as a warm-up for the US Open.

In September, she reached the final of the Ningbo International, a WTA 125 tournament, again partnering Buryachok.

2014
In July, at İstanbul Cup partnering Paula Kania, they reached the final and lost to Misaki Doi and Elina Svitolina.

2015
In July, Kalashnikova entered the ITF tournament in Contrexéville, where she won the doubles competition against Constance Sibille & Irina Ramialison, partnering  Danka Kovinić.

She then won her second title on WTA Tour at the Bucharest Open in the final against Andreea Mitu & Patricia Maria Țig, partnering Demi Schuurs.

In November, she lost two WTA 125 doubles finals, the Open de Limoges, partnering Margarita Gasparyan, and the Southern California Open, partnering with Tatjana Maria.

2016
She made the third round at the 2016 Australian Open for the first time at this Major.

She reached a career-high doubles ranking of No. 43 on 13 June 2016.

2023
At the 2023 Australian Open, she reached the third round for the second time at this Major partnering Alycia Parks where they lost to eventual champions Czech duo Krejcikova/Siniakova.

Performance timelines

Only main-draw results in WTA Tour, Grand Slam tournaments, Fed Cup/Billie Jean King Cup and Olympic Games are included in win–loss records.

Singles
Current after the season of 2021.

Doubles
Current after the 2023 Australian Open.

WTA career finals

Doubles: 9 (5 titles, 4 runner-ups)

WTA Challenger finals

Doubles: 10 (3 titles, 7 runner–ups)

ITF Circuit finals

Singles: 10 (5 titles, 5 runner–ups)

Doubles: 34 (25 titles, 9 runner–ups)

Notes

References

External links

 
 
 

1990 births
Georgian people of Russian descent
Living people
Sportspeople from Tbilisi
Female tennis players from Georgia (country)